Augustsson is a Swedish surname. Notable people with the surname include:

Andreas Augustsson (born 1976), Swedish football defender
Anna-Lisa Augustsson (1924–2012), Swedish sprinter
Danny Sjöberg-Augustsson (born 1958), former Swedish handball player
Jörgen Augustsson (born 1952), former Swedish footballer
Jakob Augustsson (born 1980), right or left wing defender
Jimmie Augustsson (born 1981), Swedish footballer
Lennart Augustsson, Swedish computer scientist

Swedish-language surnames